Zmijani is a surname. Notable people with the surname include:

 Hysen Zmijani (born 1963), Albanian footballer
 Luan Zmijani (born 1976), Albanian footballer and manager

Albanian-language surnames